Yolande of Valois (23 September 1434 – 23 August 1478), also called Yolande of France, was Duchess of Savoy by marriage to Duke Amadeus IX of Savoy, and regent of Savoy during the minority of her son Philibert I of Savoy from 1472 until 1478.

Life
She was a daughter of King Charles VII of France, "The Victorious," and Marie of Anjou. She was named after her grandmother, Yolande of Aragon. She married Duke Amadeus IX of Savoy in 1452.

Her spouse became duke of Savoy in 1465, making her duchess. Her husband's retiring disposition and epilepsy left her in control of the state, to struggle with the Savoyard barons.

Regency
After the death of her spouse in March 1472, she became regent for her son Philibert until her own death. Like her brother Charles, she was an ally to Charles, Duke of Burgundy, against her own brother Louis XI of France. After the humiliation of Burgundy at the Battle of Grandson in 1476, the duke accused her of being in league with Louis and imprisoned her. After her release, she made peace with her brother and remained on good terms with him until her death. She is said to have been one of the very few women whose intelligence he respected.

Yolanda was the first person in Europe to own a tiger during the Middle Ages. She is known to have kept one in Turin in 1478.

Issue
With Amadeus she had ten children:

 Louis of Savoy (1453)
 Anne of Savoy (1455–1480), married Frederick of Naples (1452–1504), prince of Altamura
 Charles of Savoy (1456–1471), Prince of Piedmont
 Maria of Savoy (1460–1511) married Philip of Hachberg-Sausenberg (1454–1503)
 Louise of Savoy (1462–1503), married in 1479 to Hugh de Chalon
 Philibert I of Savoy (1465–1482)
 Bernard of Savoy (1467)
 Charles I of Savoy (1468–1490)
 James Louis of Savoy (1470–1485), Count of the Genevois, France
 John Claude Galeazzo of Savoy (1472)

Ancestry

References

|-

1434 births
1478 deaths
People from Tours, France
French princesses
Duchesses of Savoy
House of Valois
15th-century French women
Burials at Vercelli Cathedral
Regents of Savoy
15th-century French people
15th-century women rulers
People of Byzantine descent
Daughters of kings